Lejops chrysostomus is the former name for a species of syrphid fly which is now called Anasimyia chrysostoma. The old name is still sometimes used for the species.

References

Eristalinae
Articles created by Qbugbot
Taxa named by Christian Rudolph Wilhelm Wiedemann
Insects described in 1830